Nigel Douglas Carne Ross (21 December 1882 – 27 January 1933) was an English cricketer. Ross' batting and bowling styles are unknown.

The son of Kate Selwyn and Joseph Ross, he was born in Penzance, Cornwall and was educated at Uppingham School, where he represented the school cricket team. Ross made his only first-class appearance for Cambridge University against Warwickshire in 1905. He scored 12 runs in the University's first-innings, before being dismissed by Sam Hargreave, while in their second-innings he scored 26 runs before being dismissed by Fred Moorhouse.

He made his debut for Buckinghamshire in the 1910 Minor Counties Championship against Devon. He played Minor counties cricket for Buckinghamshire from 1910 to 1912, which included 10 Minor Counties Championship matches. He died in Manchester, Lancashire on 27 January 1933.

References

External links
Nigel Ross at ESPNcricinfo
Nigel Ross at CricketArchive

1882 births
1933 deaths
Sportspeople from Penzance
English cricketers
Cambridge University cricketers
Buckinghamshire cricketers